The Savoia-Marchetti S.74 was a four-engine airliner developed by Savoia-Marchetti for Ala Littoria.

Design and development
The prototype first flew on 16 November 1934. Only three were ever built.

Operational history
The aircraft were used in passenger service. When Italy entered World War II in 1940, they were put into service as military transport aircraft for the Regia Aeronautica. None of the three survived the war.

Operators

Civil operators

 LATI

Military operators

 Regia Aeronautica

Specifications (S.74)

See also

References

S.74
1930s Italian airliners
World War II Italian transport aircraft
Four-engined tractor aircraft
Aircraft first flown in 1934
Four-engined piston aircraft